"You Don't Have to Live Like a Referee" is the sixteenth episode of the twenty-fifth season of the American animated television series The Simpsons and the 546th episode of the series. It originally aired on the Fox network in the United States on March 30, 2014. It was written by Michael Price and directed by Mark Kirkland. Argentine soccer broadcaster Andrés Cantor guest-stars as himself.  The title is from the refrain "don't have to live like a refugee" from the 1980 song "Refugee" by Tom Petty and the Heartbreakers.  Homer also sings a parody of Foreigner's 1981 song "Juke Box Hero".

Plot
At the School assembly, Principal Skinner presents a skit about living history, which goes horribly wrong as the kids immediately begin heckling them and the assembly quickly devolves into a disaster. Chalmers suggests holding a speech contest on the students' heroes.

After Martin beats her to the punch using her first idea, Marie Curie, Lisa changes her speech to one on Homer, in which, among other things, she remembers when she was sent off by him during a school soccer game. Lisa wins over the crowd and both kids' speeches are posted online. Lisa's goes viral, so much so that Homer is called to referee games in the World Cup in Brazil.

At the World Cup, Homer referees honestly, but soon gangsters attempt to bribe him. Wanting to retain Lisa's respect (and the fact that he is utterly uninterested in the game), Homer refuses. He continues to be an honest referee despite the players trying to bribe him when he gives them red cards.

Homer admits to Bart that it is hard to turn down the bribes, but knowing that Lisa chose him as her hero, he has no other choice. Bart decides to tell him the truth about Lisa's speech; that he never really was her first choice as a hero. Homer is so devastated he decides to accept the bribes.

During the World Cup Final (Germany vs. Brazil) Homer has been bribed to fix the game so that Brazil wins. Lisa tells him that his integrity as a referee has impressed her so much he is her real hero now. A Brazilian player known as "El Divo" (a parody of Neymar) goes down in the game and appears to be hurt. Homer, listening to Lisa, thinks he is guilty of diving. Homer calls "no penalty", denying Brazil the penalty kick and the Germans win the World Cup.

The betrayed gangsters are just about to kill Homer when Marge begs them in fluent Portuguese (which she has been attempting to learn throughout the episode) to forgive him. The gangster's mother happens to be a lady on the plane that Lisa traded seats with so the gangster's mother could watch premium HBO. She intercedes to allow the Simpsons to go free.

The Simpsons are later seen in the middle of the marsh lands and rivers of the Amazon enjoying all the beauty of the nature as Homer admires a clearing of a section of rainforest in order to make way for a Krusty Burger.

Reception
Dennis Perkins of The A.V. Club gave the episode a C, saying "Going into tonight's episode 'You Don't Have to Live Like a Referee', there was a lot of potential comic ammo to go around. For one, it's the Simpsons' first trip back to Brazil since the infamous season 13 episode 'Blame It on Lisa' which angered the Brazilian tourist board so badly that there was a lawsuit in the works. Throw in some of the old reliable Homer/Lisa relationship dynamic (ever the most dramatically evocative on the show), and all the pieces were there to assemble a memorable episode. That what eventually emerged was one of the most perfunctory of the season is genuinely a bummer."

Teresa Lopez of TV Fanatic gave the episode three out of five stars, saying "Aside from a touching story, the episode featured some hilarious scenes and sight gags. For one, Kearney placing an 'admire me' note on Homer's back (instead of the usual 'kick me' sign) during Lisa's speech was nice touch. But that one paled in comparison to the montage of creative bribe offers in Brazil. It was an amusing way to make fun of the rampant corruption found in World Cup competitions."

The episode received a 1.9 rating and was watched by a total of 3.91 million people, making it the second most watched show on Animation Domination that night.

As one of a number of episodes that were referenced when Donald Trump won the 2016 United States presidential election, this episode is notable for predicting that Brazil would lose to Germany during the 2014 FIFA World Cup, although it happened during the semifinals of said tournament and by a result of 7 goals to 1, not in the final 2–0.

In May 2015, after a corruption scandal at FIFA, the real-life world governing body of soccer, the episode received attention over social media, a phenomenon reported on by media such as the BBC.

References

External links
 

2014 American television episodes
2014 FIFA World Cup
The Simpsons (season 25) episodes
Association football culture
Television episodes set in Brazil